The Chanticleer is Averett University's student-run news magazine. Since 1922, The Chanticleer has provided community news to the students, faculty and staff of Averett. CNM has also be used to refer to the magazine as "Chanticleer News Magazine" or, more recently with the expansion of CNM's initiatives into digital media, "Chanticleer News Media." Dr. Susan Huckstep has served as The Chanticleer'''s advisor since 2010.

 History The Chanticleer was established in 1922, under the leadership of Dr. Ann Garbett. Its first 32-page issue included references to the Philomathean and Mnemosynean literary societies, poetry and a discussion of the university landscape 63 years into Averett's history. The first issue was dedicated to Miss Nelson Hackett, Art Director:

 CNM Au Courant 

 Digital Distribution 
In addition to continued print circulation, CNM began publishing issues online with its October 2010.

 Layout & Design The Chanticleer'' has undergone numerous redesigns during its 89-year run including newspaper formats and an oversized magazine layout. As of Fall 2017, the publication runs at a digest size of 8.5" x 11".

Past Editors-in-Chief 
 Bobby Allen Roach, Spring 2012
 Ashley Jackson, Spring 2011
 David Pone, Fall 2010
 Thelma Ferguson, 1922

References

External links 
 CNM's Electronic Library

1922 establishments in Virginia
Monthly magazines published in the United States
Student magazines published in the United States
Magazines established in 1922
Magazines published in Virginia